A fricasse, (Hebrew: פריקסה) is a savory fried pastry often filled with tuna, hard boiled egg, olives, harissa, preserved lemons, capers and mashed potato, with turmeric as a condiment.  They are usually purchased from traditional Tunisian food vendors. They can be made at home or in fast food restaurants.

Oral history claims that the receipe originates in 19th century Tunisia, in a Tunisian Jewish family: The hostess had prepared ahead a large quantity of fried dough fritters (for dessert) for guests who didn't show up, so instead of rolling them in sugar, she looked for ways to recycle them into a main course and simply stuffed them with the inexpensive common ingredients she had available (and which are a standard fare of Tunisian sandwiches). These fried-dough sandwiches where such a hit with her family, neighbors and their friends, that a new receipe was born.

Many Jewish families who fled Tunisia or Libya to Israel  or other countries still have this food as a family recipe, and it is therefore a relatively common street food in Israel.

References 

Arab cuisine